A breakfast martini is a marmalade cocktail with gin, marmalade, orange liqueur, and lemon juice (in place of vermouth), created by bartender Salvatore Calabrese.

The drink was invented in 1996 at the Library Bar at the Lanesborough Hotel in London, England.  A similar drink, the Marmalade Cocktail, was invented in the 1920s by Harry Craddock and published in his standard reference book, the Savoy Cocktail Book.

The name has been applied to various other martini-style drinks as well.

It is not a true martini, but is one of many  drinks that incorporate the term martini into their names.

References

Cocktails with gin
Mixed drinks
Cocktails with triple sec or curaçao
Cocktails with lemon juice